Pibanga glabricula is a species of beetle in the family Cerambycidae. It was described by Bates in 1885. It is known from Costa Rica and Panama.

References

Eupromerini
Beetles described in 1885